Frost Spur is a rock spur between Lewis Spur and Alley Spur on the north side of Dufek Massif, in the Pensacola Mountains of Antarctica. It was mapped by the United States Geological Survey from surveys and U.S. Navy air photos, 1956–66, and was named by the Advisory Committee on Antarctic Names for Charles Frost, a logistics specialist at the Office of Antarctic Programs, National Science Foundation.

References

Ridges of Queen Elizabeth Land